Middlesex County Council was the principal local government body in the administrative county of Middlesex from 1889 to 1965.

The county council was created by the Local Government Act 1888, which also removed the most populous part of the county to constitute the County of London.

Elections and political control

The county council consisted of elected councillors and co-opted county aldermen. The entire body of county councillors was elected every three years. Aldermen were additional members, there being a ratio of one alderman to three councillors. Aldermen had a six-year term of office, and one half of their number were elected by the councillors immediately after the triennial elections.

The first elections were held in January 1889. The first meeting of the "provisional" county council was held on 14 February 1889 at Westminster Town Hall. Although the council did not use political labels, among the aldermen elected were members of the parliamentary Conservative Party.

From 1919, the scarcely political composition of the council was challenged by the election of members of the Labour Party. The 1922 and 1925 elections were, for the most part, not run on party lines. In 1928, the majority of the council were described as "Moderate", with Labour forming an opposition. Labour continued to make advances at the 1931 election, and this led to the formation of a Middlesex Municipal Association "representative of all anti-Socialist members". The association was supported by the various Conservative Party organisations of the county although it was not officially affiliated to the party, and controlled the council until 1946.

In 1946, Labour took control of the county council for the first time. Following this, the Conservative Party contested elections to the county council, winning control in 1949 and holding it at the 1952 and 1955 elections. In 1958 Labour regained control.
At the elections held in 1961, the Conservatives were returned to power. These were to be the final elections to the county council: under the London Government Act 1963 the elections due in 1964 were cancelled, with the elections to the shadow Greater London Council being held instead.

Chairmen of the Middlesex County Council
The chairman of the county council chaired its meetings and also represented it in a ceremonial manner, in a similar fashion to the mayor of a borough. Twenty-nine people served as chairmen over the council's existence.

Replacement
The number of Middlesex homes, an area static in size, rose from 236,266 to 665,347 in the forty years to 1961. The chart of this rise which tapered off, shows by 1951 Middlesex formed part of the London conurbation, and in 1965 the council was abolished on the creation of the Greater London Council. All but four electoral divisions of the council's closing 87 became part of brand-new Greater London; the rest transferred to Surrey as to the two parts of Staines plus Sunbury-on-Thames or to Hertfordshire as to Potters Bar, these were three Urban Districts.

References

History of local government in Middlesex
Former county councils of England
1889 establishments in England
1965 disestablishments in England